In music history, musica reservata (also musica secreta) is either a style or a performance practice in a cappella vocal music of the latter half of the 16th century, mainly in Italy and southern Germany, involving refinement, exclusivity, and intense emotional expression of sung text.

Definition
The exact meaning, which appears in scattered contemporary sources, is a matter of debate among musicologists.  While some of the sources are contradictory, four aspects seem clear:

 musica reservata involved the use of chromatic progressions and voice-leading, a manner of composing which became fashionable in the 1550s, both in madrigals and motets;
 it involved a style of performance, perhaps with extra ornamentation or other emotive methods;
 it used word-painting, i.e. use of specific and recognizable musical figures to illuminate specific words in the text; and 
 the music was designed to be performed by, and appreciated by, small groups of connoisseurs.

Composers in the style of musica reservata included Nicola Vicentino (spelled as Musica riserbata), who wrote about it in his L'antica musica ridotta alla moderna prattica (1555); Philippe de Monte, the prolific composer of madrigals who mainly worked in Vienna; and above all, Orlande de Lassus, the renowned and versatile composer working in Munich whose Prophetiae Sibyllarum, probably written in the 1560s, may represent the peak of development of the style.  The chord progression which begins the Prophetiae Sibyllarum is jarring even to ears accustomed to 20th-century music: the opening chords are C major – G major – B major – C minor – E major – F minor, all in root position, sung to the text: "Carmina chromatico, quae audis modulata tenore" – literally "songs, which you hear rendered by a chromatic tenor" (maybe with reference to all-chromatic composition which 'technically' based on a chromatic tenor).

The style of musica reservata, with its implication of a highly refined, perhaps manneristic style of composition and performance along with a very small audience, is reminiscent both of the ars subtilior of the Avignon group of composers of the late 14th century, and also perhaps some of the contemporary avant-garde classical music of the late 20th century. The style can also be compared to the Italian composer Carlo Gesualdo's chromatic madrigals and motets a few decades later.

Notes

References and further reading 

 Gustave Reese, Music in the Renaissance.  New York, W.W. Norton & Co., 1954.  
 Article "Musica reservata", in The New Grove Dictionary of Music and Musicians, ed. Stanley Sadie.  20 vol.  London, Macmillan Publishers Ltd., 1980.  
 Harold Gleason and Warren Becker, Music in the Middle Ages and Renaissance (Music Literature Outlines Series I).  Bloomington, Indiana.  Frangipani Press, 1986.  

Renaissance music